Aphanamixis is a genus of trees or shrubs in the family Meliaceae

Selected species

 List sources :

References

 
Meliaceae genera
Taxonomy articles created by Polbot